Jan Eric Cartwright (August 26, 1938 – February 21, 1986) was an American politician who served in the Oklahoma House of Representatives from the 13th district from 1971 to 1973 and as the Attorney General of Oklahoma from 1979 to 1983.

He died of leukemia on February 21, 1986, in Oklahoma City, Oklahoma at age 47.

Career
Private Practice, 1963–65
Assistant County Attorney for Muskogee County, 1965
Assistant US Attorney for Eastern District of Oklahoma, 1965–67
Private Practice, 1967-1971
State Representative for 13th District (Muskogee County), 1971-1973
Counsel to Governor David Boren, 1973-1976
Commissioner of the Oklahoma Corporation Commission, 1976-1979
Attorney General of Oklahoma, 1979-1983
Private Practice, 1983–86

References

1938 births
1986 deaths
20th-century Members of the Oklahoma House of Representatives
Oklahoma Attorneys General
Democratic Party members of the Oklahoma House of Representatives
20th-century American politicians